Piney Creek is a stream in southern Carroll County of the U.S. state of Arkansas. It is a tributary to the Kings River.

The stream headwaters arise near  at an elevation of approximately 1660 feet. The source area is on the southwest flank of Usery Mountain just north of Arkansas Highway 68 about one half mile northeast of Gobbler. The stream flows northwest parallel to Arkansas Highway 103 past Rudd and Metalton.

Piney Creek was so named for the pine timber along its course.

References

Rivers of Carroll County, Arkansas
Rivers of Madison County, Arkansas
Rivers of Arkansas